Juvincourt-et-Damary is a commune in the Aisne department in Hauts-de-France in northern France.

Juvincourt Airfield
Built prior to World War II as a French Air Force facility.  It was seized by the Germans in June 1940 during the Battle of France, and was used as a major Luftwaffe military airfield during the occupation.

The airfield was attacked on several occasions by United States Army Air Forces Eighth Air Force heavy bombers and later by IX Bomber Command B-26 Marauder medium bombers, the airfield was liberated by Allied Forces in early September 1944.    Once in American hands, combat engineers of the IX Engineering Command 820th Engineer Aviation Regiment repaired the damaged airfield and declared it operationally ready for combat units on 7 September, only a few days after its capture from German forces, being designated  as "A-68"

The airfield was used by numerous Ninth Air Force combat units until May 1945.  Afterward, the airfield was used for transport and as a maintenance base until being closed in July 1945, and was returned to French Air Force Control.

After the war, the French Air Force began building a new facility, with a new taxiway and modern dispersal pads.   However, it appears that construction was never completed and the airfield was abandoned.  Today the remains of Juvincourt Airfield consist of several abandoned World War II-era runways, along with the unfinished modern airfield in a vacant area.

Population

See also
Communes of the Aisne department

References

Communes of Aisne
Aisne communes articles needing translation from French Wikipedia